Petrovsk is the name of several inhabited localities in Russia.

Modern localities
Urban localities
Petrovsk, Saratov Oblast, a town in Saratov Oblast

Rural localities
Petrovsk, Bryansk Oblast, a village in Semyachkovsky Rural Administrative Okrug of Trubchevsky District in Bryansk Oblast; 
Petrovsk, Irkutsk Oblast, a village in Tulunsky District of Irkutsk Oblast
Petrovsk, Kozelsky District, Kaluga Oblast, a village in Kozelsky District of Kaluga Oblast
Petrovsk, Medynsky District, Kaluga Oblast, a village in Medynsky District of Kaluga Oblast
Petrovsk, Pskov Oblast, a village in Pechorsky District of Pskov Oblast
Petrovsk, Samara Oblast, a settlement in Chelno-Vershinsky District of Samara Oblast
Petrovsk, Tomsk Oblast, a village in Pervomaysky District of Tomsk Oblast

Alternative names
Petrovsk, alternative name of Bolshoye Petrovskoye, a village in Teryayevskoye Rural Settlement of Volokolamsky District in Moscow Oblast; 
Petrovsk, alternative name of Petrovskoye, a selo in Semisolinsky Rural Okrug of Morkinsky District in the Mari El Republic;

See also
Petrovsky (inhabited locality), several inhabited localities in Russia
Petrovsk-Zabaykalsky (town), a town in Zabaykalsky Krai, Russia